The Consortium of European Taxonomic Facilities (CETAF) is a taxonomic research network formed by scientific institutions in Europe. It was formed in December 1996 by ten of the largest European natural history museums and botanical gardens to be a voice for taxonomy and systematic biology in Europe, to promote scientific research and access to European natural history collections, and to exploit European funding opportunities. Since then, CETAF has served as a meeting point for major European natural history museums and botanical gardens, and has initiated and played an important role in a number of projects (see Initiatives and related projects section below).

Currently, CETAF has 37 members, which constitute a total of 63 institutions spanning 22 European countries (see Members section below). One of these members, the Royal Belgian Institute of Natural Sciences, also hosts CETAF's General Secretariat.
 
Together, CETAF institutions hold a large fraction (c. 500 million objects) of the world’s most important natural history collections, and the scientific staff have unique expertise in taxonomy and systematics. Biodiversity loss, global warming and other environmental issues need natural history collections and related expertise as sources of knowledge and for reference. The increasing political and public awareness of environmental questions and their importance for society provide both challenges and opportunities for taxonomic facilities.

CETAF strives to represent the interests of its member institutions, to enhance the visibility of its members, and to be a powerful voice for natural history collections and collections-based research in Europe.

General Meetings
General Meetings with representatives of each member institution are held twice a year. The meetings are hosted by any of the member institutions and held at any of the European natural history museums or botanic gardens. Current business between the General Meetings are run by the Chair and the Steering Committee, assisted by the Secretariat.

Initiatives and related projects
A number of CETAF members, or national consortia in which CETAF members play leading roles, have since 1998 received support through the European Commission's Framework Programmes to enhance transnational access to their collections, equipment and expertise.

CETAF initiatives
SYNTHESYS (Synthesis of Systematic Resources) – A CETAF Integrated Infrastructure Initiative in EU FPVI and FPVII
European Distributed Institute of Taxonomy (EDIT) – A CETAF network of Excellence in Taxonomy for Biodiversity and Ecosystem Research, EU FPVI, which started 1 March 2006. The project ended in 2011.
European Journal of Taxonomy (EJT) – A peer-reviewed international journal in descriptive taxonomy, covering the eukaryotic world.
Distributed European School of Taxonomy (DEST) – Established by EDIT

CETAF related research projects
European Network for Biodiversity Information (ENBI) – This was the European contribution to the Global Biodiversity Information Facility (GBIF). The project was coordinated by the Zoological Museum Amsterdam, and ended in 2015.
Biological Collection Access Service (BioCASe) – Historically, this was known as the Biological Collection Access Service for Europe (BioCASE).
Fauna Europaea
ICEDIG (Innovation and consolidation for large scale digitisation of natural heritage)
EU BON (European Biodiversity Observation Network)
BIOTALENT – a blended e-learning biodiversity training programme

Members
The following is a list of members, the nations in which these members are situated, and associated institutions:

References

CETAF position paper, Museo Nacional de Ciencias Naturales (CSIC) Madrid, Spain, 2004.

External links
CETAF official website
BioCASE Portal
CETAF publications

Biology in Europe
Taxonomy
Museum associations and consortia
Scientific organisations based in Belgium
Taxonomy (biology) organizations